Franco Moretti (born 1950 in Sondrio) is an Italian literary historian and theorist. He graduated in Modern Literatures from the University of Rome in 1972. He has taught at the universities of Salerno (1979–1983) and Verona (1983–1990); in the US, at Columbia (1990–2000) and Stanford (2000–2016), where in 2000 he founded the Center for the Study of the Novel, and in 2010, with Matthew Jockers, the Stanford Literary Lab. Moretti has given the Gauss Seminars at Princeton, the Beckman Lectures at Berkeley, the Carpenter Lectures at the University of Chicago, and has been a lecturer and visiting professor in many countries, including, until the end of 2019, the Digital Humanities Institute at the École Polytechnique Fédérale de Lausanne.

Biography
Franco Moretti is an Italian literary historian and theorist. Born in Sondrio in 1950, he graduated in Modern Literatures from the University of Rome in 1972, after writing a dissertation on the British poets and intellectuals of the 1930s. He was initially a researcher at the Universities of Pescara and Rome (1972–1979), one of the founding editors of the journals Calibano and Il leviatano, and a contributor to the cultural pages of the new left daily newspaper il manifesto. In 1977–78 he was a Fulbright scholar at Occidental College. Later, he taught English and Comparative Literature at the Universities of Salerno (1979–1983), Verona (1983–1990), Columbia (1990–2000) and Stanford (2000–2016), where in 2000 he founded the Center for the Study of the Novel, and in 2010, with Matthew Jockers, the Stanford Literary Lab .A volume collecting a selection of Literary Lab pamphlets has recently been translated into French, German, Spanish, and Italian, while individual pamphlets have appeared into more than a dozen languages, including Chinese, Russian, Turkish and Korean.

Over the years, Moretti has been visiting professor at various universities in Europe and North America – including Copenhagen, Toronto, La Sapienza, and the École des Hautes Études en Sciences Sociales in Paris – twice a fellow of the Wissenschaftskolleg zu Berlin (1999–2000, 2012–2013), advisor of the French Ministry for Education, and member of the "Digital Humanities Institute" of the École Polytechnique Fédérale de Lausanne in Switzerland (2016–2019). He has given the Gauss Seminars at Princeton, the Beckman Lectures at Berkeley, and the Carpenter Lectures at the University of Chicago, the Patten Lectures at Indiana University and the Iser lecture at the University of Konstanz. The work of this “great iconoclast of literary criticism”, as The Guardian once called him, has been translated into 30 languages, and has been the object of two collections of essays – Reading Graphs, Maps, Trees. Critical Responses to Franco Moretti, in 2011, and Lire de près, de loin, in 2014. The essays Moretti collected in Distant Reading received in 2014 the prize of the “National Book Critics’ Circle". The Los Angeles Review of Books and PMLA have devoted special forums to his work, as has the Russian journal New Literary History in 2018, and the French journal Romantisme in 2021. His work – and in particular the formula “distant reading”, presented in the essay “Conjectures on World Literature”– has inspired books and journal issues, and generated work in the disparate fields of literary criticism, philosophy, political science, law, plus conferences and long-term research projects in several countries. Most recently, Moretti's work has been examined in the collection Critica sperimentale, with contributions by Gisèle Sapiro, Patricia McManus, Guido Mazzoni, Francoise Lavocat, Mads Rosendahl Thomsen, Stefano Ercolino, Jérôme David and others.

In 2017, Kimberly Latta accused Moretti, in a Facebook post, of having sexually assaulted her in 1985. He denied the accusation, stating their relationship had been fully consensual. Later, two other allegations of harassment from the 1990s emerged, both denied by Moretti. No formal proceeding of any sort was ever opened against him. A Stanford spokesperson declared that the university was reviewing the case and "determining whether there are any actions for Stanford to take", and the process was concluded without any action ever being taken.

Moretti is currently emeritus professor at Stanford, and a “permanent fellow” at the Wissenschaftskolleg in Berlin. He is a member of the American Academy of Arts and Sciences, of the American Philosophical Society, and of the scientific board of the “Institute for World Literature“ at Harvard. He is a regular contributor to New Left Review, and has continued to advise doctoral students in various countries (Tartu, Lausanne, Harvard, Paris, Siena), receiving an honorary doctorate from Babeș-Bolyai University in Cluj, and becoming a member of the Brno Narratological Circle. His latest book – Far Country. Scenes from American Culture, published simultaneously in Italy, the United States and Britain in 2019 – is framed by a long reflection on his first and last university courses, that covers the years from 1979 to 2016; the German edition – Ein fernes Land, Konstanz University Press, 2020 – has been saluted as a “future standard for the field” and “a mandatory reading for all those who are beginning to study the humanities”. During the pandemic of 2020–22, Moretti has continued to give lectures online for audiences in Copenhagen, Berlin, Delhi, Naples, São Paulo and more.

He is the brother of Italian filmmaker and Palme d'Or-winner Nanni Moretti. He played roles in three films directed by his brother: The Defeat (La sconfitta, 1973, short), Pâté de bourgeois (1973, short), and I Am Self Sufficient (Io sono un autarchico, 1976).

Work 
Moretti has made several contributions to literary history and theory. Some ideas popularized by Moretti are traceable to earlier sources.  Opposing subjective interpretations of literature, Moretti proposed a number of materialistic, empirical approaches to literature and other arts. His major contributions were in the domains of literary geography (now largely associated with Moretti's name) and digital humanities; he also contributed to combining literary studies with the world-systems analysis and Darwinian theory of evolution. Moretti has coined several concepts that are now widely used in the humanities, the main of which is distant reading. Distant reading is opposed to close reading: a traditional approach in literary studies when a critic closely examines a separate text, traces all the possible intertextual connections. Distant reading has the opposite goal: the scholar should "step back" from an individual text to see a larger picture: for example, the history of a genre during a century or the evolution of a particular artistic device over many decades. Moretti's conception of literary evolution in Distant Reading (2013) is quite similar to the psychologist Colin Martindale's (Clockwork Muse, 1990) “scientific,” computational, neo-Darwinist project of literary evolution. The role of reading is downplayed by both Martindale and Moretti. Martindale's book has been largely ignored by literary scholars. According to Martindale, the principles of the evolution of art are based on statistic regularities rather than meaning, data or observation.  “So far as the engines of history are concerned, meaning does not matter. In principle, one could study the history of a literary tradition without reading any of literature. […] the main virtue of the computerized content analysis methods I use is that they save one from actually having to read the literature” (p. 14). Martindale's idea of the computerized and statistical data replacing reading has been reiterated by Moretti.

The history of bourgeois culture 
Moretti's scientific work has largely focused on European bourgeois culture, beginning with The Way of the World. The Bildungsroman in European Culture (1987, second enlarged ed. 2000). The book examines the great tradition of the novel of youth – Wilhelm Meister, Pride and Prejudice, The Red and the Black, Eugene Onegin, Lost Illusions, Great Expectations, Sentimental Education, Middlemarch ... – considered as the “symbolic form” that allowed nineteenth-century culture to make sense of the political revolutions and economic transformations of western modernity. Modern Epic. The World System from Goethe to Garcia Marquez (1996), broadened the analysis in space and time, examining texts that transcend national cultures in trying to represent the planetary system of capitalism: Faust, Moby-Dick, Wagner's Ring, Ulysses, The Waste Land, and the great narratives of Latin-American magic realism. More recently, The Bourgeois. Between History and Literature (2013) has completed this trilogy of bourgeois existence by tracing its historical keywords (“useful”, “comfort”, “efficiency”, “seriousness”, “roba”...), and following the metamorphoses of “prose” from Defoe to Ibsen and Max Weber.

Literary geography 
Moretti has offered a new – cartographic – perspective on literature in his Atlas of the European Novel (1997). On the one hand, he demonstrated geographic patterns that can be traced within literature: the geography of Jane Austen's characters, places of origin of villains in British literature, the locations of Balzac's novels, etc. This, though, was hardly original: Vladimir Nabokov famously taught novelists such as Jane Austen and James Joyce with the aid of location maps. On the other hand, Moretti suggested studying the geography of literary economics: how and why translations of novels spread across Europe, how book selection in small town libraries differ from book selection in the libraries in large cities, etc.

Digital humanities 
Together with Matthew Jockers, Moretti founded Stanford Literary Lab in 2010. Already in his Atlas of the European Novel, Moretti approached literature with quantitative methods. The Literary Lab continued this direction of work, but this time quantifying literature via the tools of digital text analysis. Those methods include counting word frequencies, topic modeling, building character networks, etc. The results of Lab's work were published as Pamphlets of the Literary Lab (the history of how Lab arrived at this unusual publication format is described by Moretti in Pamphlet 12). Stanford Literary Lab became one of the pioneering groups pursuing computational criticism, and a visible actor in the new field of digital humanities. Equally novel was the concept of the humanities "lab", as it is mostly associated with hard sciences.

World-systems analysis 
In many of his works, Moretti relies on one strand of historical macrosociology – world-systems analysis – and its main theorist, Immanuel Wallerstein. World-systems analysis divides all countries into three groups: core, semi-peripheral, and peripheral. Core countries dominate the world by having a monopoly over some kind of products, which they export to the peripheral and semi-peripheral countries. Over time, the latter countries learn how to produce the much needed products themselves, but core countries usually acquire monopolies over other important products, and so the structure of the world-system remains relatively stable. Moretti suggested that the same principle may work in the domain of arts. Certain countries have monopoly over producing film or literary forms, while other countries import those forms. According to Moretti, in the 19th century England and France constituted the core of the literary world-system, exporting novels worldwide; today, Hollywood, which exports movies has a similar role.

Literary evolution 
Applying Darwinian theory to literature is an idea that dates back to the late 19th century (initial attempts were made by Ferdinand Brunetière and Alexander Veselovsky). Literary Darwinism becomes a popular movement in 20th century literary criticism. Joseph Carroll, Denis Dutton, Jonathan Gottschall, Brian Boyd, Ellen Spolsky, Nancy Easterlin, among others, contributed to the evolutionary literary studies. In their wake, Moretti used the techniques of "distant reading": statistics and computation to study literary evolution. The interest in Darwin's theory in the humanities coincided with the emergence in the 1990s and 2000s of the new research domain called cultural evolution.

Publications

Books

Turkish translations

Selected journal articles

Awards and honors
2013 National Book Critics Circle Award (Criticism), winner for Distant Reading
2015 Moretti is elected a permanent fellow at the Berlin Institute for Advanced Study

References

Further reading

External links 
 Franco Moretti at Stanford University Department of English
 Appointment to American Academy of Arts and Sciences
 Distant reading on Amazon
 Graphs, Maps, Trees on Amazon
 Princeton UP website for Moretti, ed., The Novel
 

Italian classical scholars
Living people
Columbia University faculty
Sapienza University of Rome alumni
1950 births
People from Sondrio